Pachycnemia is a genus of moths in the family Geometridae erected by James Francis Stephens in 1829.

Species
Pachycnemia benesignata
Pachycnemia hippocastanaria
Pachycnemia tibiaria

References

Ennomini
Taxa named by James Francis Stephens